Constance Taylor Fischer is a psychologist and retired as Professor Emeritus at Duquesne University, best known for her work on individualized psychological assessment.

Early life 
Constance T. Fischer was born in Oahu, Hawaii in 1938.

Education and career 
She received her B.A. degree in Political Science from the University of Oklahoma in 1960. In 1963, she graduated the University of Kentucky with a M.A in Psychology. Fischer received her PhD in Clinical Psychology from the University of Kentucky as well, in 1966. She is a Professor Emeritus at Duquesne University in Pittsburgh, Pennsylvania.

Awards and honors 
In 2005, Fischer was awarded the Carl Rogers Award, which is awarded for "an outstanding contribution to the theory and practice of humanistic psychology". Awarded the Bruno Klopfer Award in 2006.

Works 

 Individualizing Psychological Assessment (1985)
 On the Way to Collaborative Psychological Assessment (2017)
Client Participation in Human Services: The Prometheus Principle
The Qualitative Vision for Psychology

References

External links 
 Constance T. Fischer publications indexed by ResearchGate

Created via preloaddraft
American women psychologists
1938 births
University of Oklahoma alumni
University of Kentucky alumni
Duquesne University faculty
Living people
21st-century American women